Narahari is the surname of Vasudevan Prabhuraman, which belongs to (Raju's) surya vamsham Kshatriyas . They inhabit the Guntur, Krishna, Prakasam, Nellore and Rayalaseema districts of Andhra Pradesh, and in some Karnataka districts.

Modern community 

Narahari's are part of the Telugu Kshatriya Community. They are mainly concentrated in Guntur, Krishna, Prakasam, other Rayalaseema Districts, and also in Bellary District of Karnataka.

Other castes who have surnames  belong to other Sudra Gotras.
Narahari (Raju) people possess last names of Raju, Varma, or Ray.

Surnames of Indian origin
Raju
Telugu-language surnames